Klukwan (Tlingit: Tlákw.aan) is a census-designated place (CDP) in Alaska, United States. It is technically in Hoonah-Angoon Census Area, though it is an enclave of Haines Borough. At the 2010 census the population was 95, down from 139 at the 2000 census.

History
Klukwan began as a Chilkat Tlingit village along the trade route later known as the Dalton Trail. In 1880, the U. S. Navy reported the name of the village as "Chilcat of Klukquan". The name is Tlakw Áan in Tlingit, meaning roughly "forever village" due to its antiquity. Klukwan is the only remaining of five Chilkat villages that were in the area before 1900.

Geography
Klukwan is located at  (59.400098, -135.893393). It is bordered to the west by the Covenant Life CDP.

Klukwan is an enclave of Haines Borough, Alaska. Although Klukwan is located in the Hoonah-Angoon Census Area of the Unorganized Borough, it is entirely surrounded by territory of Haines Borough, and therefore cut off from the rest of the Census Area.

Demographics

Klukwan first appeared on the 1880 U.S. Census as "Kluckquan", an unincorporated Tlingit village. With 565 residents, it was recorded as the 5th largest community in Alaska. In 1890, it reported as "Klakwan." It next appeared in 1910 under its present spelling of Klukwan. It was made a census-designated place (CDP) as of the 1980 census.

As of the census of 2000, there were 139 people, 44 households, and 31 families residing in the CDP. There were 85 housing units at an average density of 68.4/sq mi (26.5/km2). The racial makeup of the CDP was 10.07% White, 88.49% Native American, 0.72% Asian, and 0.72% from two or more races. 3.60% of the population were Hispanic or Latino of any race.

There were 44 households, out of which 54.5% had children under the age of 18 living with them, 45.5% were married couples living together, 15.9% had a female householder with no husband present, and 27.3% were non-families. 25.0% of all households were made up of individuals, and 6.8% had someone living alone who was 65 years of age or older. The average household size was 3.16 and the average family size was 3.75.

In the CDP, the age distribution of the population shows 33.1% under the age of 18, 13.7% from 18 to 24, 23.7% from 25 to 44, 23.0% from 45 to 64, and 6.5% who were 65 years of age or older. The median age was 27 years. For every 100 females, there were 104.4 males. For every 100 females age 18 and over, there were 121.4 males.

The median income for a household in the CDP was $30,714, and the median income for a family was $31,563. Males had a median income of $26,250 versus $26,250 for females. The per capita income for the CDP was $11,612. There were none of the families and 1.5% of the population living below the poverty line, including no under eighteens and none of those over 64.

References

Census-designated places in Alaska
Census-designated places in Hoonah–Angoon Census Area, Alaska
Census-designated places in Unorganized Borough, Alaska
Enclaves in the United States